Medical Information Technology can refer to
 Health technology
 Health information technology
 Meditech, Medical Information Technology, Inc.

See also 
 Health informatics